Lánchíd Rádió (lit. "Chain Bridge Radio") was a privately owned radio station in Hungary. It began broadcasting 15 March 2007 and offered news, reports, interviews, cultural programs and popular music. It is Hungary's 10th most listened radio station.

On April 11, 2018, the radio was partially ceased because the owners did not want to continue funding it. Currently, only music is being played, because the radio has obligation to broadcast until the frequency license expiration.

The radio station was founded by a media group owned by Lajos Simicska which also operates Hír TV and Magyar Nemzet.

The radio station's political views have been called conservative, right wing and national-populist.

Program 
The musical program is composed of contemporary to classic pop- and rock music both from Hungarian and international artists. Weekdays between 14:00 and 16:00 the show Dr. Boross rendel ("Dr. Boross orders") moderated by György Boross allows people to call and request music to be played. His show used to be hosted on Sztár fM from 2007 on, but the radio station shut down in 2011.

Weekdays between 16:30 and 18:30 Levente Bella moderates the show Lecsó (named after Lecsó). People are invited to call and give their opinions about current Hungarian and international topics.

Broadcasting 
Lánchíd Rádió broadcasts from many cities in Hungary, and also offers an internet live-stream.

References 

Radio stations in Hungary
2007 establishments in Hungary
2018 disestablishments in Hungary
Defunct radio stations
Radio stations established in 2007
Radio stations disestablished in 2018
Defunct mass media in Hungary